The Winnebago Presbytery is a district governing body of the Presbyterian Church (USA) (PCUSA). It is one of the 16 Presbyteries of the Synod of Lakes and Prairies. It consists of congregations located primarily in North Central and Northeastern Wisconsin. The Winnebago Presbytery consists of 33 congregations:
 Bethesda Presbyterian Church, Pickett
 Covenant Community Presbyterian Church, Schofield
 First Presbyterian Church, Abbotsford
 First Presbyterian Church, Arpin
 First Presbyterian Church, Athelstane
 First Presbyterian Church, Fond du Lac
 First Presbyterian Church, Green Bay
 First Presbyterian Church, Kiel
 First Presbyterian Church, Manitowoc
 First Presbyterian Church, Marshfield
 First Presbyterian Church, Merrill
 First Presbyterian Church, Neenah
 First Presbyterian Church, Oconto
 First Presbyterian Church, Omro
 First Presbyterian Church, Oshkosh
 First Presbyterian Church, Shawano
 First Presbyterian Church, Sheboygan
 First Presbyterian Church, Wausau
 First Presbyterian Church, Wausaukee
 First Presbyterian Church, Weyauwega
 First Presbyterian Church, Winneconne
 First United Presbyterian Church, De Pere
 First Presbyterian Church, Shawano
 Forest Larger Parish Presbyterian Church, Laona/Lakewood/Wabeno
 Frame Memorial Presbyterian Church, Stevens Point
 Hope Presbyterian Church, White Lake
 Melnik Presbyterian Church
 Memorial Presbyterian Church, Appleton
 Pioneer Presbyterian Church, Marinette
 Riverside Presbyterian Church, Gleason
 Robinsonville Presbyterian Church, New Franken
 Wequiock Presbyterian Church, Green Bay
 Wild Rose Presbyterian Church

References 

Presbyterian Church (USA) presbyteries